Mount Dandenong is a small township/suburb of Greater Melbourne, Victoria, Australia,  east from Melbourne's central business district, located within the Shire of Yarra Ranges local government area. Mount Dandenong recorded a population of 1,271 at the 2021 census.

Light to moderate snowfalls occur on Mount Dandenong a few times most years, mostly frequently between late winter and late spring. The area around Mount Dandenong experienced a highly unusual summer snow fall on Christmas Day 2006.

History

Originally the town was to be named Mount Corhanwarrabul, but due to the problems that were foreseen with the spelling and pronunciation of this name, the Surveyor-General's office opted to name it Mount Dandenong. However, today there is still a Mount Corhanwarrabul, which is on the site of Burkes Lookout. The town of Mount Dandenong was settled in 1893, along with a neighbouring town, Olinda. It was around this time that the Government established  farms that would be used to harvest timber.

By around 1900 the town had its own general store and primary school. The Post Office, opened in 1902, was closed and replaced by one at Kalorama in 1991. In 1922 the first motorcars were seen in operation in Mount Dandenong.

In 1938, the 1938 Kyeema Crash occurred eighteen people were killed when the Kyeema, an Australian National Airways DC-2, VH-UYC crashed.

A proposal around 2002 for the building of a large "Melbourne" sign on the mountain, similar to the Hollywood sign, was vigorously opposed and not pursued.

Climate
Mount Dandenong has an oceanic climate (Cfb) with warm summers and cool winters. The temperature usually is 3 - 7 °C (5.4 - 12.6 °F) cooler than downtown Melbourne due to its elevation and distance from the urban island heating effect of Melbourne.

Recent snowfalls
2007 - 17 and 18 July
2006 - 25 December
2006 - 15 November
2006 - 28 October
2005 - 10 August

References

Yarra Ranges